The 1995 Australian Open was a professional non-ranking snooker tournament that took place between 17 and 19 September 1995 at the Bentleigh Club in Melbourne, Australia. The tournament featured many of the same players that participated in the 1995 Australian Masters several days earlier.

Anthony Hamilton won the tournament by defeating Chris Small 9–7 in the final.

Main draw

References

Australian Goldfields Open
1995 in Australian sport
1995 in snooker
September 1995 sports events in Australia